Autódromo Eusebio Marcilla is a  motorsports circuit located in Junín, Argentina. The circuit was inaugurated on 3 June 1971, and it was named in honour of Eusebio Marcilla, the circuit was completely redesigned between 2009 and 2011. The redesigned circuit was opened on 7 August 2011 with Turismo Carretera race. Besides Turismo Carretera, the circuit has hosted some other national championships, such as TC2000 Championship and Top Race V6.

Lap records 

The official fastest race lap records at the Autódromo Eusebio Marcilla are listed as:

References

Motorsport venues in Buenos Aires Province